Steve "Iron" Maden (born 13 September 1967) is an English former professional rugby league footballer who played in the 2000s and 2010s.

Background
Steve Maden was born in Ashton-in-Makerfield, Greater Manchester, England.

Club career
Maden began his rugby league career at Leigh Centurions Academy before he transferred to Warrington Wolves, he transferred from Warrington Wolves to St. Helens, he transferred from St. Helens to Leigh Centurions in 2004, and was part of the side that won promotion to Super League, although injury ruled him out of the Grand Final victory over Whitehaven, he played for Leigh Centurions' in 2005's Super League X campaign, he transferred from Leigh Centurions to Whitehaven for a two-year spell, he transferred from Whitehaven to Leigh Centurions for the 2008 season, he appeared on loan from Leigh Centurions for Swinton Lions during 2014.

References

External links
Leigh Centurions profile
Profile at saints.org.uk

1982 births
Living people
English rugby league players
Leigh Leopards players
People from Ashton-in-Makerfield
Rugby league centres
Rugby league fullbacks
Rugby league players from Wigan
Rugby league wingers
St Helens R.F.C. players
Swinton Lions players
Warrington Wolves players
Whitehaven R.L.F.C. players